The 2002 British National Track Championships were a series of track cycling competitions held from 28–31 August 2002 at the Manchester Velodrome.

Medal summary

Men's Events

Women's Events

References

National Track Championships